Torrey Loomis (born 1974) is currently the Creative Director for Hattori Hanzo Shears as well as a filmmaker, executive producer, photographer, and former business owner. One of the first known owners of the RED ONE digital cinema camera, Loomis acquired two RED ONE cameras #20 and #21 (known as "Hobbes" and "Calvin") from RED Digital Cinema in 2007. One of the first full length feature films to be shot on RED ONE, Sensored was shot on RED ONE camera #21. In addition to Sensored, he best known for films such as Bloodline, Cafe, and The Killing of Mary Surratt.

As owner of Silverado Studios, Loomis contributed to production on non-cinema projects such as music videos, political ads, documentaries, and reality television shows. Prior to that, Loomis was a patrol officer and police investigator at Scotts Valley Police Department in Santa Cruz County from 1996 to 2002. Loomis also served in the U.S. Marine Corps Reserves from 1994-2002 at Echo Co. 2/23 4th MarDiv in San Bruno, CA.

Executive Production

Shorts - Executive Producer 
 Susannah (Executive produced with Joe Carnahan as part of the OpenCut project)  Winning edit: Susannah (Official Cut)  Written & directed by Evan Nicholas (USA 2009)  Starring John Borgis & Ben Bray  Executive Producer Joe Carnahan & Torrey Loomis  Edited by Carsten Kurpanek  Distinctions: Official Selection AFI Dallas, 2009
 Roundup at Palo Duro

Reality television - Executive Producer 
Saved by Grace (reality television, 2010) Saved by Grace Pilot Link  Saved by Grace Main Title Open (Vimeo)
Outtake from Saved by Grace (Vimeo)
Dangerous Waters (reality television, 2011) Article: Folsom film connections run deep with ‘Dangerous Waters’

Political ads - Executive Producer 
 Cathleen Galgiani, 2008 CA Assembly Campaign (Vimeo Link)
 Christopher Cabaldon, 2008 CA Assembly Campaign (Vimeo Link)

Distinctions

Film Awards 

 Tradizione - Best Cinematography, 2012 (co-shot with W. Spencer Davies)  Sacramento Film & Music Festival 10x10 Filmmaker's Challenge

Professional Awards 

 RAW Artist 2012 Photographer of the Year (Sacramento)
 City of Scotts Valley - Employee of the Year, 2000
 City of Scotts Valley - Officer of the Year, 1999
 City of Marina - Reserve Police Officer of the Year, May 1995

Business Awards 

 Inc. 5000 Fastest Growing Companies in America - 2008 - Inc. Magazine
 Inc. 5000 Fastest Growing Companies in America - 2009 - Inc. Magazine
 100 Fastest Growing Companies in Sacramento - 2007 - Sacramento Business Journal
 100 Fastest Growing Companies in Sacramento - 2008 - Sacramento Business Journal
 100 Fastest Growing Companies in Sacramento - 2009 - Sacramento Business Journal

Education 
Loomis is a graduate from CSU Monterey Bay and Monterey Peninsula College with the following degrees:

 California State University - Monterey Bay  B.S. Applied Computing, Telecommunications, and Multimedia
 Monterey Peninsula College  A.A. Liberal Arts
 Monterey Peninsula College  A.A. Psychology
 Monterey Peninsula College  A.A. Law Enforcement

References

External links
 Torrey Loomis website

1974 births
Living people
American filmmakers